KQUE (980 AM, 100.7 FM), is a Spanish language Christian radio AM station, with an FM relay translator, in the Houston, Texas, metropolitan area. KQUE is dually licensed to both Rosenberg, Texas and Richmond, Texas and is currently owned by Daij Media, LLC.

History

The KQUE calls have resided in the Houston area since 1960, having first occupied 102.9 FM, then 1230 AM. The calls are now shared with co-owned Aleluya sister KQUE-FM Bay City.

Prior to Daij Media's acquisition of 980, the station was owned by Univision Radio. It featured a Tejano format, using the call letters KRTX, and the name "Super Tejano 980AM KRTX". This was later shortened to "Tejano 980". Originally, this station was a country station as KFRD, from 1949 until it was sold to Roy Henderson in 1990, at which time the KMPQ calls were requested, as KFRD was moved to 1090 KACO in Bellville. Tichenor Media (predecessor to Univision) purchased the station from Henderson in 1995. 104.9 KAMA-FM Missouri City, Texas was the original counterpart to 980 as KFRD-FM, when both facilities were still owned by the original Fort Bend Broadcasting Company headed by Mart Cole, Sr. and both KFRD and KFRD-FM were still licensed to their original COL of Rosenberg.

Translator

References

External links

QUE
Rosenberg, Texas
QUE